Jonathan Tiomkin (known as "Jon"; born July 12, 1979, in Brooklyn, New York) is an  American Olympic foil fencer.

Fencing career

High school
Tiomkin began fencing when he was a freshman at Hewlett High School in Hewlett, New York. He defeated the team captain on the first day of practice.

NCAA Championships

Fencing for St. John's University, Tiomkin won the bronze medal in foil at the 1999 NCAA Championships, and was a 1st-team All-American.  In 2001 he came in 6th.  He won the silver medal in 2002.

National competitions

Tiomkin won that national title in foil in 1999 and 2003, and placed second in 2004.

Pan American Games

At the 2003 Pan American Games, he won a gold medal in the team foil event and silver in individual foil.

World Championships

His individual results at the World Fencing Championships were 64th at the 2001 World Fencing Championships and 2003 World Fencing Championships, 52nd at the 2002 World Fencing Championships, and 45th at the 2006 World Fencing Championships. His best team result was 9th in 2003.

World Cup

Tiomkin won the bronze medal in the 2005 Shanghai World Cup.

Olympics
At the 2004 Summer Olympics, Tiomkin advanced to the round of 32, where he was defeated 3–15 by the number 1 seed, Andrea Cassarà of Italy. In the team foil event, the US team reached the semifinals, and finished in 4th place.

Maccabiah Games

Tiomkin, who is Jewish, fenced in the 2001 Maccabiah Games, winning team silver medals in épée and foil.

Miscellaneous

Tiomkin is a 2002 graduate of St. John's University, where he was a finance major.
Tiomkin trains at the Fencers Club.  His coaches are Simon Gershon and Mikhail Petin.
He lives in New York City.
Tiomkin owns and runs a fencing club in Hewlett, New York called the Five Towns Fencers Club.
Tiomkin is the son of Reuven and Rebecca Tiomkin.
Enjoys cliff-diving, skydiving, and pool diving.

See also
List of select Jewish fencers

References

External links
US Olympic Team bio
US Fencing Media bio
Jewish Virtual Library bio

Jewish male foil fencers
Jewish American sportspeople
1979 births
Living people
Olympic fencers of the United States
St. John's Red Storm fencers
Fencers at the 2004 Summer Olympics
George W. Hewlett High School alumni
Competitors at the 2001 Maccabiah Games
Maccabiah Games medalists in fencing
Maccabiah Games silver medalists for the United States
People from Hewlett, New York
Sportspeople from Brooklyn
Sportspeople from Nassau County, New York
American male épée fencers
Pan American Games gold medalists for the United States
Pan American Games silver medalists for the United States
Pan American Games medalists in fencing
Fencers at the 2003 Pan American Games
Medalists at the 2003 Pan American Games
21st-century American Jews
Jewish male épée fencers
American male foil fencers
American fencing coaches